Benjamin Knight was an industrialist.

Ben(jamin) Knight may also refer to:

Ben Knight (actor) (born 1975), Australian actor
Benjamin Knight (politician) (1836–1905), member of the California legislature
Ben Knight (footballer) (born 2002), English footballer
President Benjamin Knight (fictional), List of fictional United States Presidents
Invisible: The Chronicles of Benjamin Knight, film starring Alan Oppenheimer